David Pines (June 8, 1924  May 3, 2018) was the founding director of the Institute for Complex Adaptive Matter (ICAM) and the International Institute for Complex Adaptive Matter (I2CAM) (respectively, United States-wide and international institutions dedicated to research in and the understanding of emergent phenomena), distinguished professor of physics, University of California, Davis, research professor of physics and professor emeritus of physics and electrical and computer engineering in the Center for Advanced Study, University of Illinois at Urbana–Champaign (UIUC), and a staff member in the office of the Materials, Physics, and Applications Division at the Los Alamos National Laboratory.

His seminal contributions to the theory of many-body systems and to theoretical astrophysics were recognized by two Guggenheim Fellowships, the Feenberg Medal, the Edward A. Frieman Prize for Excellence in Graduate Student Research, Dirac and Drucker prizes, and by his election to the National Academy of Sciences, American Philosophical Society, American Academy of Arts and Sciences, Russian Academy of Sciences, and Hungarian Academy of Sciences and visiting professorships at the California Institute of Technology, College de France, Trinity College, Cambridge, University of Leiden, and the Université de Paris.

He was the founding director of the Center for Advanced Study, UIUC (1968–70), was vice-president of the Aspen Center for Physics from 1968 to 1972, founder and  co-chair of  the US-USSR Cooperative Program in Physics, 1968–89; and a co-founder, vice-president,  chair of the board of trustees, and co-chair of the science board of the Santa Fe Institute, from 1982 to 1996.

He was the organizer or co-organizer of fifteen workshops and two summer schools of theoretical physics, was an honorary trustee and honorary member of the Aspen Center for Physics, and a member of the board of overseers at Sabancı University in Istanbul. Pines died on May 3, 2018 due to pancreatic cancer.

Early life
David Pines was born to Sidney Pines, a mechanical engineer, and Edith Pines (née Aldeman). He graduated from Highland Park High School in Dallas in 1940, and then studied at Black Mountain College for one year before enrolling at the University of California, Berkeley

Pines earned a bachelor's degree in physics from UC Berkeley in 1944, and began graduate work there. His studies were interrupted after his first semester when he was drafted into the navy. He served for two years, and then followed Robert Oppenheimer, who had served as a mentor at Berkeley, to Princeton University in 1947. He earned his Ph.D. at Princeton under David Bohm in 1950.

Research interests
His last research concerned the search for the organizing principles responsible for emergent behavior in materials where unexpectedly new classes of behavior emerge in response to the strong and competing interactions among their elementary constituents. Some recent research results on correlated electron materials are the development of a consistent phenomenological description of protected magnetic behavior in the pseudogap state of underdoped cuprate superconductors and the discovery of the protected emergence of itinerancy in the Kondo lattice in heavy electron materials and its description using a two-fluid model. He remained interested in the superfluidity of neutron stars revealed by pulsar glitches and in elementary excitations in the helium liquids.

Recent scientific articles
 Protected Behavior in the Pseudogap State of Underdoped Cuprate Superconductors (with V. Barzykin), Phys. Rev. Lett., in the press and condmat 0601396, 2006
 Complex Adaptive Matter: Emergent Phenomena in Materials (with D.L. Cox),  MRS Bulletin 30, 425-429, 2005
 Scaling and the Magnetic Origin of Emergent Behavior in Correlated Electron Superconductors (with N. Curro and Z. Fisk), MRS Bulletin 30, pp442–446, 2005
 The Pseudogap: Friend or Foe of High Temperature Superconductivity (with M. Norman and C. Kallin), Adv. Phys. 54, 715, 2005
 Scaling in the Emergent Behavior of Heavy Electron Materials, (with N. Curro,  B-L. Young, and J. Schmalian)  Phys. Rev.B. 70, 235117 (2004)
 Two Fluid Description of the Kondo Lattice (with S. Nakatsuji and Z. Fisk), Phys Rev. Lett. 92,016401, 2004
 Low Frequency Spin Dynamics in the CeMIn5 Materials (with N. Curro et al.), Phys, Rev. Lett.90, 227202, 2003
 A Spin Fluctuation Model for d-wave Superconductors (with A. Chubukov and j. Schmalian),  in “The Physics of Conventional and Unconventional
 Superconductors”, ed. K.H. Benneman and J. B. Ketterson, Springer Pub, 2003 (cond-mat/0201140)
 The Quantum Criticality Conundrum (with R.B. Laughlin, G. Lonzarich, and P. Monthoux), Advances in Physics 50, 361-365, 2001
 The Middle Way (with R. B.Laughlin, B.Stojkovic, J. Schmalian, P.Wolynes), PNAS 97,32-37, 2000
 The Theory of Everything (with R. B. Laughlin), PNAS 97, 27-32 (2000)

Career history
 A.B. University of California, Berkeley 1944
 M.A. Princeton University 1948
 Ph.D. Princeton University 1950
 Instructor, University of Pennsylvania 1950–52
 Research assistant professor, UIUC 1952–55
 Assistant professor, Princeton University 1955–58
 Member, Institute for Advanced Study 1958–59
 Professor of physics & electrical engineering, UIUC 1959–1995
 Professeur Associe, Faculte des Sciences, Université de Paris 1962–63
 Founding director, Center for Advanced Study, UIUC 1967–70
 Visiting professor, NORDITA 1970
 Visiting scientist, Academy of Sciences, USSR 1970 and 1978
 Visiting scientist, Academy of Sciences, China 1973
 Exchange professor, Université de Paris 1978
 Professor, Center for Advanced Study, UIUC 1978–1990
 Visiting scientist, Hungarian Academy of Sciences 1979
 Gordon Godfrey Professor, University of New South Wales 1985
 B. T. Matthias Visiting Scholar (Los Alamos National Laboratory) 1986
 Professor, College de France 1989
 Center for Advanced Study professor of physics and electrical computer engineering, UIUC 1990–1995
 External professor, Santa Fe Institute 1989–2002
 Robert Maxwell Professor, Santa Fe Institute 1991
 S. Ulam Visiting Scholar, Los Alamos National Laboratory 1996–97
 Visiting professor, Royal Institute of Technology, Stockholm, 1998
 Visiting fellow-commoner, Trinity College, University of Cambridge 2000

Honors
 Member, National Academy of Sciences
 Member, American Philosophical Society
 Fellow, American Academy of Arts and Sciences
 Foreign member, Russian Academy of Sciences
 Honorary member, Hungarian Academy of Sciences
 Fellow, American Association for Advancement of Science
 Fellow, American Physical Society

Awards
 National Science Foundation Senior Postdoctoral Fellow in Copenhagen and Paris 1957–58
 John Simon Guggenheim Memorial Fellow 1962–63 and 1970–71
 Lorentz Professor, University of Leiden 1971
 Fritz London Memorial Lecturer (Duke Univ.) 1972
 Giulio Racah Memorial Lecturer (Hebrew Univ.) 1974
 Marchon Lecturer (Univ. of Newcastle upon Tyne) 1976
 Sherman Fairchild Distinguished Scholar (Caltech) 1977
 Eugene Feenberg Memorial Lecturer (Washington U) 1982
 Eastman Kodak - Univ. of Rochester Distinguished Lecturer 1983
 Friemann Prize in Condensed Matter Physics 1983
 Dirac Medal for the Advancement of Theoretical Physics 1985
 Emil Warburg Lecturer (Univ. of Bayreuth) 1985
Eugene Feenberg Medal 1985
 Daniel C. Drucker Eminent Faculty Award 1994
 John Bardeen Prize for Superconductivity Theory 2009
 Julius Edgar Lilienfeld Prize 2016

Significant publications on quantum liquids

 A Collective Description of Electron Interactions:  III.  Coulomb Interactions in a Degenerate Electron Gas (with D. Bohm).  Phys. Rev. 92, 609-625 (1953)
 A Collective Description of Electron Interactions:  IV.  Electron Interaction in Metals.  Phys. Rev. 92, 626-636 (1953)
 Electron Interaction in Metals.  Solid State Physics, eds. F. Seitz and D. Turnbull, Academic, N.Y., 1, 3-51 (1955)
 The Correlation Energy of a Free Electron Gas (with P. Nozières).  Phys. Rev. 111, 442-454 (1958)
 Collective Energy Losses in Solids.  Rev. Mod. Phys. 28, 184-199 (1956)
 The Motion of Slow Electrons in Polar Crystals (with T. D. Lee and F. Low). Phys. Rev. 90, 297-302 (1953)
 Electron-Phonon Interaction in Metals (with J. Bardeen).  Phys. Rev. 99, 1140–1150 (1955)
 Nuclear Superconductivity, Proc. of the Rehovoth Conf. on Nuclear Structure, Interscience Press, 26-27 (1957)
 Possible Analogy Between the Excitation Spectra of Nuclei and Those of the Superconducting Metallic State (with A. Bohr and B. Mottelson).  Phys. Rev. 110, 936-938 (1958)
 Ground-State Energy and Excitation Spectrum of a System of Interacting Bosons (with N. Hugenholtz).  Phys. Rev. 116, 489-506 (1959)
 Effective Interaction of He3 Atoms in Dilute Solutions of He3 in He4 at Low Temperatures (with J. Bardeen and G. Baym).  Phys. Rev. 156, 207-221  (1967)
 Zero Sound in Liquid 4He and 3He, Quantum Fluids, Proc. of the Sussex University Symp., 16–20 August 1965, ed. D. F. Brewer, North-Holland Pub. Co., Amsterdam), pp. 257–277 (1966)
 Polarization Potentials and Elementary Excitations in He II at Low Temperatures (with C. H. Aldrich III).  J. Low Temp. Phys. 25, 677-690 (1976)
 Polarization Potentials and Elementary Excitations in Liquid 3He (with C. H. Aldrich III).  J. Low Temp. Phys. 32, 689-715 (1978)
 Roton Liquid Theory (with K. Bedell and I. Fomin).  J. Low Temp. Phys. 48, 417-433 (1982)
 Pseudopotential Theory of Interacting Roton Pairs in Superfluid 4He (with K. Bedell and A. Zawadowski).  Phys. Rev. B 29, 102-122 (1984)
 Superfluidity in Neutron Stars (with G. Baym and C. Pethick).  Nature 224, 673-674 (1969)
 Inside Neutron Stars, Proc. of 12th Int. Conf. on Low Temperature Physics, ed. Eizo Kanda, Academic Press of Japan, pp. 7–21 (1971)
 Superfluidity in Neutron Stars (with M. A. Alpar).  Nature 316, 27-32 (1985)
 Quasiparticle Interactions in Neutron Matter for Applications in Neutron Stars  (with J. Wambach and T. L. Ainsworth).  Nucl. Phys. A 555, 128-150 (1993)
 Phenomenological Model of Nuclear Relaxation in the Normal State of YBa2Cu3O7 (with A. Millis and H. Monien).  Phys. Rev. B 42, 167-177 (1990)
 Toward a Theory of High Temperature Superconductivity in the Antiferro-magnetically Correlated Cuprate Oxides (with P. Monthoux and A. Balatsky).  Phys. Rev. Lett. 67, 3448-3451 (1991)
 Spin-fluctuation-induced Superconductivity in the Copper Oxides: A Strong Coupling Calculation (with P. Monthoux).  Phys. Rev. Lett. 69, 961-964 (1992)
 Nearly Antiferromagnetic Fermi Liquids are High Temperature Supercon-ductors:  Are the Superconducting Cuprates Nearly Antiferromagnetic Liquids?  J. Chem. Phys. Solids 54, 1447–1455 (1993)
 Complex Adaptive Matter: Emergent Phenomena in Materials (with D.L. Cox),  MRS Bulletin 30, 425-429, 2005
 Scaling in the Emergent Behavior of Heavy Electron Materials (with N. Curro,  B-L. Young, and  J. Schmalian, Phys. Rev. B 70,235117 (2004)
 Protected Behavior in the Pseudogap State of Underdoped Cuprate Superconductors (with V. Barzykin), Phys. Rev. Lett., in the press and condmat 0601396, 2006

Books
 The Many-Body Problem.  (W. A. Benjamin: N.Y) 456 pp. (1961) (Russian translation, State Publishing House, Moscow, 1963)
 Elementary Excitations in Solids.  (W. A. Benjamin: N. Y.)  312 pp.  (1963) (Russian translation, State Publishing House, Moscow, 1965). Japanese translation (Syokabo Press, Tokyo, 1974)
 The Theory of Quantum Liquids, Vol. I Normal Fermi Liquids.  W. A. Benjamin: NY, 1, 355 pp. (1966).  (Russian Translation, Publishing House MIR, Moscow, 1968)
  Book details.
 The Theory of Quantum Liquids Vol. II:  Superfluid Bose Liquids (with P. Nozières), Addison-Wesley, 180pp (1990)

Editorial contributions
 Founding editor, Frontiers in Physics, 1961–present
 Editor, Reviews of Modern Physics 1973–96
 Editor/co-editor of five books

Educational and public service
 Co-founder of the Center for Advanced Study, UIUC, 1967; the Aspen Center for Physics, 1967–69; the US-USSR Cooperative Program in Physics, 1968; the Santa Fe Institute, 1982–84; and the Institute for Complex Adaptive Matter, 1998–1999
 Organizer or co-organizer of fifteen workshops and two summer schools of theoretical physics
 Aspen Center for Physics: vice-president, 1968–72;
 Board of trustees 1968–80; honorary trustee, 1980-; member, 1980-2018
 Santa Fe Institute: co-founder, 1984; vice-president,
 1984–86; board of trustees, 1984–2002; chair, board of trustees, 1986–87; founding co-chair, science board, 1987–96; member, science board, 1987–1999; 2001-; external faculty 1995-2018
 Institute for Complex Adaptive Matter: founding director and member of board of trustees (now board of governors) and science steering committee, 1999–2018
 National Academy of Sciences; chair, Panel on Condensed Matter Physics, 1994–98
 National Academy of Sciences/National Research Council:
 Physics Survey Committee, 1965–66;
 Board on International Scientific Exchange, founder and chair, 1973–1977
 US/USSR Workshops in Condensed Matter Theory, founder and co-chair, 1968; 1970; 1974; 1978; 1988
 US/USSR Commission on Cooperation in Physics, founder and co-chair, 1975–80
 American Academy of Arts and Sciences: chair, physics section and class membership committee, 1996–99
 Los Alamos National Laboratory:
 T Division Advisory Committee:  member 1975–82; chair, 1977–1982
 Institute for Defense Analyses, mentor, Defense Sciences Study Group, 1985–2000

References

External links
 Institute for Complex Adaptive Matter- a Multicampus and Multidisciplinary Research Program of the University of California

1924 births
2018 deaths
American physicists
Fellows of the American Physical Society
Members of the United States National Academy of Sciences
Theoretical physicists
Scientists from Missouri
Physicists from Missouri
Members of the American Philosophical Society
Foreign Members of the USSR Academy of Sciences
Foreign Members of the Russian Academy of Sciences
Santa Fe Institute people
United States Navy personnel of World War II
People from Kansas City, Missouri